Thought Bubble (also known as the Yorkshire Comic Art Festival) is an annual comics art festival and comic book convention held in Yorkshire. Established in 2007, Thought Bubble has been credited as being the UK's largest comics convention. The not-for-profit festival's chosen charity is Barnardo's.

Thought Bubble takes place for a week in November each year (in conjunction with the Leeds International Film Festival), taking place all over Yorkshire, and culminates in a two-day convention in Harrogate. A dance party is usually held on the Saturday night before the festival's final day.

Thought Bubble is held in the spirit of European conventions like the Angoulême International Comics Festival. As such, it is focused on the art and literature of the comics form, and only minimally on related pop-culture expression and merchandising. In addition to the exhibitor tables, Thought Bubble features art exhibits, animation screenings, panel discussions, workshops, and a costume parade. As founded by Tula Lotay, one of the festival's central aims is to celebrate female comics creators. Each year, the main image for that year's festival is illustrated by a woman. Lotay said, "Moving forward we’re going to keep this theme alive and expand it to include other diverse groups within the industry. I can't wait to see the next set of wonderful images."

Beginning in 2011, the Thought Bubble Anthology, an annual collection of original comics, was released in conjunction with the festival. 

From 2012 to 2016, the British Comic Awards were presented at Thought Bubble.

History 
In 2007, Tula Lotay, who grew up in West Yorkshire, founded Thought Bubble to promote comic books to the general public, especially children with reading difficulties. Her efforts were sponsored by the local comics and board games retailer Travelling Man, where Lotay worked as her day job. The first Thought Bubble was held in November 2007 as a one-day event in the basement of Leeds Town Hall. The 2008 convention, held at Savile's Hall, Leeds Dock, was followed by an after-party at the Alea Casino.

In 2010, the Northern Sequential Art Competition was held in conjunction with the festival; the first Thought Bubble Anthology featured comics by the winners, and expanded to include works from featured comics professionals. (The art competition was later branded as the Thought Bubble Comic Art Competition.) Thought Bubble Anthology #1, published by Image Comics, debuted in 2011, and issues came out annually through 2015. Issues #1-5 were collected in trade paperback form and published as the Thought Bubble Anthology Collection (136 pages, Image Comics, 2016). All proceeds from the Thought Bubble Anthology went to the children's charity Barnardo's.

In 2013, festival founder Lotay was given the Bob Clampett Humanitarian Award at the Eisner Awards ceremony, held at the San Diego Comic-Con. The 2013 festival featured the Thought Bubble Comic Art Competition; comics by the winners — Simon Gurr, Ulises Lopez, Ross Mackintosh, Lizzy Mikietyn, Zoom Rockman, and Charlotte Tuffrey — were featured in the Thought Bubble Anthology #4. The 2013 festival featured 450 exhibitors; the British Comic Awards presentation was hosted by Adam Cadwell and David Monteith.

In 2014, the festival invited its first overseas guests, including Natasha Allegri, Emily Carroll, Becky Cloonan, Danielle Corsetto, Adam Hughes, Jeff Lemire, Scott Snyder, Allison Sohn, and Jillian Tamaki.

The 2017 festival featured the exhibition "Heretics", folk-horror art based on the 2017 44FLOOD series created by P. M. Buchan, Martin Simmonds, and series editor Kasra Ghanbari.

In 2019, the convention itself moved from Leeds to Harrogate; the move mostly came about due to space constraints in Leeds.

The 2020 festival was cancelled due to the COVID-19 pandemic; it returned to in-person status in November 2021.

In 2022, festival founder Tula Lotay announced she was stepping down as festival director of Thought Bubble, to concentrate on her art career and family. Taking over as new festival director was Nabil Homsi, owner of the comics and board game retailer Travelling Man.

Thought Bubble Anthology

Convention locations and dates 
This list documents the dates of the Thought Bubble convention, which is preceded by a festival in Leeds.

In popular media 
The festival's dance floor was memorialized in Kieron Gillen and Jules Scheele's "The Oral History of the Thought Bubble Dancefloor," published in the anthology Pros and (Comic) Cons (Dark Horse, 2019).

References

Citations

Sources

External links 
 

2007 establishments in England
Arts festivals in England
British fan conventions
Comics conventions
Cultural festivals in the United Kingdom
Festivals in Yorkshire
Recurring events established in 2007